The 2012–13 Torino F.C. season was the club's 102nd season of competitive football, 85th season in the top division of Italian football and 68th season in Serie A.

Season overview
Torino were promoted to Serie A after three years in the lower division, the president Urbano Cairo decided to continue the partnership with the coach Giampiero Ventura and sporting director Gianluca Petrachi for the 2012–13 season, the 96th in the top flight in Torino's history. The return to Serie A also granted the club an income of between €30–40 million, including TV rights, placement in the standings and domestic trophies.

Transfers

Summer 2012

In

Out

Winter 2012–13

In

Out

Players

Squad information

Competitions

Serie A

League table

Results summary

Results by round

Matches

Coppa Italia

Statistics

Appearances and goals

|-
! colspan="10" style="background:#dcdcdc; text-align:center"| Goalkeepers

|-
! colspan="10" style="background:#dcdcdc; text-align:center"| Defenders

|-
! colspan="10" style="background:#dcdcdc; text-align:center"| Midfielders

|-
! colspan="10" style="background:#dcdcdc; text-align:center"| Forwards

|-
! colspan="10" style="background:#dcdcdc; text-align:center"| Players transferred out during the season

Top scorers
This includes all competitive matches.  The list is sorted by shirt number when total goals are equal.
{| class="wikitable sortable" style="font-size: 95%; text-align: center;"
|-
!width=15|
!width=15|
!width=15|
!width=15|
!width=150|Name
!width=80|Serie A
!width=80|Coppa Italia
!width=80|Total
|-
|1
|9
|FW
|
|Rolando Bianchi
|11
|0
|11
|-
|2
|11
|MF
|
|Alessio Cerci
|8
|0
|8
|-
|3
|10
|FW
|
|Barreto
|3
|0
|3
|-
|=
|69
|FW
|
|Riccardo Meggiorini
|3
|0
|3
|-
|5
|3
|DF
|
|Danilo D'Ambrosio
|2
|0
|2
|-
|=
|7
|MF
|
|Mario Santana
|2
|0
|2
|-
|=
|14
|MF
|
|Alessandro Gazzi
|2
|0
|2
|-
|=
|19
|MF
|
|Alen Stevanović
|2
|0
|2
|-
|=
|33
|MF
|
|Matteo Brighi
|2
|0
|2
|-
|=
|80
|FW
|
|Jonathas
|2
|0
|2
|-
|=
|86
|FW
|
|Valter Birsa
|2
|0
|2
|-
|12
|
|
|
|Own goals
|1
|0
|1
|-
|=
|4
|MF
|
|Migjen Basha
|1
|0
|1
|-
|=
|10
|FW
|
|Alessandro Sgrigna1
|1
|0
|1
|-
|=
|24
|FW
|
|Gianluca Sansone
|1
|0
|1
|-
|=
|25
|DF
|
|Kamil Glik
|1
|0
|1

Key:
1:Alessandro Sgrigna left in the January transfer window

References

Torino F.C. seasons
Torino